Debashree may refer to:
Debashree Roy, an Indian actress and dancer
 Debashree Mazumdar, an Indian sprint athlete
 Deboshree Chowdhury, a Bengali politician